Jaquan Monte Brisker (born April 20, 1999) is an American football safety for the Chicago Bears of the National Football League (NFL). He played college football at Lackawanna College and Penn State prior to being selected by the Bears 48th overall in the 2022 NFL Draft.

Early life and education
Brisker grew up in Pittsburgh, Pennsylvania and attended Gateway High School in Monroeville, Pennsylvania, where he played basketball and football. 

Brisker was initially recruited by several major college football programs until it became apparent that he would be academically ineligible to play NCAA Division I football due to a low SAT score. He instead enrolled at Lackawanna College in Scranton, Pennsylvania over offers from Youngstown State, Toledo, and California University of Pennsylvania.

College career

Lackawanna College
Brisker began his collegiate career at Lackawanna College. After his freshman season, Brisker committed to transfer to Penn State over offers from Alabama, Ole Miss, Maryland, Mississippi State, Pittsburgh, Utah, and West Virginia. As a sophomore, he had 64 tackles, 17 tackles for loss, and nine sacks with five passes broken up, one forced fumble and one fumble recovery.

Penn State
In his first season at Penn State, Brisker played in 13 games and finished the year with 32 tackles with two interceptions and three pass break ups. He was named a starter going into his senior season was named third-team All-Big Ten after recording 57 tackles, four passes broken up and one interception.

Brisker decided to utilize the extra year of eligibility granted to college athletes who played in the 2020 season due to the coronavirus pandemic and return to Penn State. During the 2021 season, Brisker was voted as a team captain while tallying 64 total tackles, 5.5 tackles for loss, two interceptions, five passes broken up, and a fumble recovery. On December 28, 2021, Brisker announced he would be skipping the 2022 Outback Bowl and declared for the 2022 NFL Draft. He was voted as a second-team All-American, first-team All-Big Ten, and accepted an invite to the Senior Bowl (later electing to opt-out).

College statistics

Professional career

Brisker was drafted by the Chicago Bears with the 48th overall pick in the second round of the 2022 NFL Draft. To obtain the pick, the Chicago Bears traded Khalil Mack to the Los Angeles Chargers, while also receiving a future sixth round pick.

In his professional debut, during a 19–10 win over the San Francisco 49ers, Brisker recorded four tackles and recovered a fumble. On October 24, against the New England Patriots, Brisker got his first career interception, off of Patriots quarterback Mac Jones. On November 20, facing off against Atlanta Falcons Brisker went to tackle quarterback Marcus Mariota and got his head slammed into tight end MyCole Pruitt's back. Slow to get up Brisker was helped off the field. He missed just one snap on defense before returning to the game. In the third quarter, Brisker assisted a tackle on former Bears' return specialist Cordarrelle Patterson ending in him hitting the turf while grabbing his head. He returned to the next series and finished the game. The next day, Brisker was diagnosed with a concussion and missed the next two games. Brisker finished the season with 104 combined tackles, four sacks, two pass deflections, a forced fumble, and recovery, as well as an interception. Following the regular season, Pro Football Focus named Brisker to the 2022 All-Rookie Team. He was also voted as the Bears' Rookie of the Year by CBS Sports Chicago.

NFL career statistics

References

External links
 Chicago Bears bio
Penn State Nittany Lions bio
Lackawanna Falcons bio

1999 births
Living people
American football safeties
Chicago Bears players
Lackawanna Falcons football players
Penn State Nittany Lions football players
People from Monroeville, Pennsylvania
Players of American football from Pittsburgh